Ville Väisänen (born 19 April 1977) is a Finnish former footballer who last played as defender in Finnish second division team FC OPA. Väisänen has also tried his hands at managing - his latest spell being with Oulun Nice Soccer for seasons 2011 and 2012.

Career
Väisänen started his career in 1996 in his home country with his hometown team OTP which played in Finland third tier Kakkonen scoring four goals in the first few games. Soon after he moved to south to city of Pori to play for league side FC Jazz, eventually making his debut the following year. He moved to the Netherlands, where he played for two seasons for De Graafschap in Doetinchem before he returned to Finland, with first TPV then FC Lahti.

In 1999, he moved to Norway for one season, before his career took him to Greece, with Ethnikos Asteras. In 2001, he again returned to Finland, spending two seasons, then moved across Scandinavia, with Norwegian-side Bryne FK then Swedish Ljungskile SK. In 2005, Väisänen moved to Finland to play two seasons with FF Jaro.
In August 2006, he moved to England to play with Darlington, after being signed by manager David Hodgson. He played five times but suffered a knee injury, and when Hodgson was replaced by new manager Dave Penney, Väisänen was released in December.
Väisänen then moved back to Finland to play for his hometown team Oulun Palloseura playing in Kakkonen. He played as a midfielder and was a captain of the team.
He left the team at the end of season to continue his studies in England and to find a new team.

Väisänen eventually returned to Oulu to play for another hometown team, FC OPA for five games. His brother Kalle Väisänen also played for the team. After a short spell at OPA, Ville Väisänen head back to England to finish his studies and played for a Northern League Division One side Spennymoor Town for the 2008–09 season.

He also earned five caps for the Finland national side. He managed JS Hercules for a period of time in 2007. In October 2008, he became a gym instructor at Headlam Hall hotel in Headlam, County Durham, England. While studying he also managed junior side FC Marton in Middlesbrough.

Väisänen has signed for FC OPA for the season 2009. He is did assistant managing for Tervarit U17 team in Oulu for the season 2009.
In the season 2010 Väisänen took a bigger role in FC OPA. He signed a player-manager contract which kept him at FC OPA for another year.

References

External links
 
 
 Guardian's Stats Centre
 Ville Vaisanens player profile

1977 births
Living people
Sportspeople from Oulu
Association football defenders
Finnish footballers
Finland international footballers
Finnish football managers
FC Jazz players
De Graafschap players
FC Lahti players
FC Haka players
Bryne FK players
Ljungskile SK players
FF Jaro players
Ethnikos Asteras F.C. players
Darlington F.C. players
Spennymoor Town F.C. players
Veikkausliiga players
English Football League players
Eliteserien players
Finnish expatriate footballers
Expatriate footballers in England
Expatriate footballers in the Netherlands
Expatriate footballers in Greece
Expatriate footballers in Norway
Expatriate footballers in Sweden
Oulun Työväen Palloilijat players
JS Hercules managers